A capuchon is a raised lip at the front of a ship's funnel or railway steam locomotive chimney. It is intended to prevent down draughts when in motion and encourage smoke to rise. Sometimes capuchons were made of plate steel bolted or welded in place, others were an integral part of the chimney casting. The name derives from their resemblance to a type of ceremonial hat.

Usage

Ships
When fitted to ships' funnels the intention is to keep the after decks clear of exhaust smuts.

Locomotives
On railway locomotives it is to keep smoke clear of the line of sight of the locomotive crew. Many Belgian locomotives that were built in the late 19th or early 20th centuries were fitted with distinctive high capuchons, for example the Type 8 4-6-0 compounds.

Chimneys